was a private junior college in Ōmuta, Fukuoka, Japan.

History 
The junior college was founded as a women's junior college in 1987. It became coeducational in 1998. It closed in 2006.

Academic departments
 Culture of Japan
 International communication
 Management information

See also 
 List of junior colleges in Japan

External links
  

Japanese junior colleges
Universities and colleges in Fukuoka Prefecture